Krantikari Adivasi Mahila Sangathan (English: Revolutionary Adivasi Women's Organisation) is a banned women's organisation based in India. The Krantikari Adivasi Mahila Sangathan (KAMS) is a successor of the Adivasi Mahila Sanghathana (AMS). The foundation of the AMS was laid by the Maoists in 1986.

Aims and objectives
The count of the KAMS's registered members is about 90,000, which ranks it amongst the top-most women's organisations in India when it comes to numbers of registered members. But, Rahul Pandita, in 2011, claimed that the members of the KAMS are estimated to number around 100,000.

The KAMS concentrates on addressing various social issues faced by the women. The members of the KAMS crusades against the evil practises against women in the society like abducting the women and forcing them to marry against their will, polygyny, etc. The organisation's members have also campaigned against the adivasi tradition of forcing women to stay away from the village and take shelter in the forest during her menstruation period. The members also take a stand against the patriarchal mentality within their communities. In Dandakaranya, the adivasi men did not permit the women to sow seeds in the fields, but when the members of the KAMS approached the Communist Party of India (Maoist), the party held meetings (with the adivasis) to address the issue. While during the meets, the adivasi men have accepted their mistake and decided to refrain for such activities, they are yet to bring their resolution to practise. However, the CPI (Maoist) have ensured that the women are allowed to sow seed, raise vegetables, and construct check dams "on common lands, which belongs to the Jantana Sarkar" (people's government).

In Bastar, the KAMS members have rallied with hundreds in numbers to highlight the atrocities by the police, and a few times the attendance figure have been in thousands to "physically confront" the police.

Arundhati Roy writes,

The organisation's members also addresses problems like forced migration and other political issues as well. Roy says that the KAMS has also been opposing mining in the Dandakaranya region.

Alleged atrocities by Salwa Judum
A senior worker from the KAMS told Arundhati Roy that after facing "bestial sexual mutilation" and getting raped by the Salwa Judum members, several of the organisation's members have left the KAMS and joined the CPI (Maoist). A number of girls, who were not the members of the KAMS but witnessed the atrocities upon the KAMS members by the Salwa Judum members, have also joined the Maoists.

Legal status
The KAMS was reported to be a frontal organisation of the Communist Party of India (Marxist–Leninist) People's War, and was thus banned. Arundhati Roy says that the Government of India can "wipe out" all the 90,000 members of the organisation, any time. She writes,

See also
 Chetna Natya Manch
 Mahila Atma Raksha Samiti
 Nari Mukti Sangh
 National Federation of Indian Women

References

Communist Party of India (Maoist)
Feminist organisations in India
Women's wings of political parties in India
Maoist organisations in India
Women's wings of communist parties
Organisations designated as terrorist by India